Milford Haven Refinery was an oil refinery situated on the Pembrokeshire coast in Wales, United Kingdom. The refinery began operating in 1973 under Amoco's ownership, but in its final years it was owned by Murco Petroleum. The closure of the refinery was announced in November 2014. The site was sold to Puma Energy in 2015 for use as a petroleum storage and distribution terminal.

History
Milford Haven Refinery is situated on a 1200-acre site near Milford Haven. The refinery came on stream in 1973 under Amoco's ownership. A major upgrade was carried out in 1981, and a catalytic cracker was added.  Since then further units have been added, notably a naptha isomerisation unit and a hydrodesulphurisation unit. 

In August 1983, a major boilover fire required 150 firemen, 50 fire engines and two days to extinguish.

Ownership 
The refinery was originally owned and operated by Amoco. In 1981 Murco (a subsidiary of Murphy Oil) purchased a 30% share of the refinery. Elf bought Amoco's interest in 1990 and Elf was acquired by Total in 2000. In December 2007 Murco purchased Total's 70% interest in the refinery to become the 100% owner.  In 2010 Murco expressed a desire to sell the refinery. In April 2014 the company warned that it may have to close the site, and began a consultation process with staff. In June 2014 it was reported that the refinery had been sold to the Klesch Group, safeguarding 400 jobs at the site.
In November the deal fell through and it was announced that the refinery will be converted into a 'storage and distribution facility' with a loss of over 300 jobs.  The refinery entered a 'shut-down' period and was decommissioned while the company looked for a new buyer.

In March 2015 the site was acquired by Puma Energy, along with three English inland terminals at Westerleigh, Theale and Bedworth. Puma Energy said it would convert the site into a petroleum storage and distribution terminal.

At 0900 BST Sunday 21 July 2019 the two large stacks were demolished via controlled explosion.

Production
At its close the refinery had an annual processing capacity of 5.5 million tonnes (108,000 barrels per day). The refinery imported all its feedstocks from the nearby marine terminal, to which the refinery was linked by mainly underground pipeline. Refined products were distributed by road, rail, sea and pipeline to the Midlands and Manchester. The refining units and capacity were:

1983 fire
In August, 1983, an accidental fire occurred at the facility's number 11 crude storage tank. Filled with more than 46,000 tonnes of oil, the flaming storage tank experienced multiple boil overs, spreading the fire nearly four acres. In all, 150 firefighters and 70 fire appliances were needed to tackle the blaze. While six firefighters were injured during the two day fire, no one was killed.

See also
Pembroke Refinery, Milford Haven waterway
Esso Refinery, Milford Haven, decommissioned 1983
Gulf Refinery, Milford Haven, decommissioned 1997
List of oil refineries

References

External links

Oil refineries in the United Kingdom
Buildings and structures in Milford Haven